Pavlo Ivanovych Kotovenko (born 25 March 1979 in Lviv) is a Ukrainian retired football player and coach.

References

1979 births
Living people
Ukrainian footballers
FC Lviv (1992) players
FC Karpaty-2 Lviv players
FC Rotor Volgograd players
Russian Premier League players
Ukrainian expatriate footballers
Expatriate footballers in Russia
FC Mordovia Saransk players
FC Obolon-Brovar Kyiv players
Ukrainian football managers
Association football midfielders
Sportspeople from Lviv